Zoco may refer to:

Ignacio Zoco (1939–2015), Spanish soccer player of the 1960s
Zoco, Tibet
A brand name of the Spanish liqueur Patxaran